Pradopolis is a municipality in the state of São Paulo in Brazil. The population is 21,873 (2020 est.) in an area of 167 km². The elevation is 538 m.

References

Municipalities in São Paulo (state)